The Central Goulburn Valley Football League (CGVFL) was established on Monday, 11 March 1946 at the Annual General Meeting of the Goulburn Valley Football Association, when a name change of this Australian rules football competition took place.

History
The Central Goulburn Valley Football League (CGVFL) was established on Monday, 11 March 1946 at the Annual General Meeting of the Goulburn Valley Football Association, when a name change of this Australian rules football competition took place.

In July, 1946, former Richmond player and Katandra captain, Eddie Ford collided with an Ardmona player, but played out the game and went home, but later became ill. Ford was taken to the Mooroopna Hospial, where he later died.

In 1947, CGVFL premiers, Ardmona were defeated by the premiers of the Murray Football League, Cobram, played at Numurkah in October, 1947.

On Thursday, 23 February 1950, the Centrals Seconds Association officially folded up and existing teams were recommended to join the CGVFL senior football competition.

At the 1950 CGVFL – AGM, Miepoll were admitted into the competition, Sheparton East and SPC merged, but joined the Goulburn Valley Football League as City United Football Club and Mr. J Pearson was elected as secretary for the 25th consecutive year of the following football competitions –  
Goulburn Valley Second Eighteens Football Association – 1926 to 1936
Goulburn Valley Football Association – 1937 to 1945
Central Goulburn Valley Football League – 1946 to 1952

In June, 1950, the Goulburn Valley Football League 13.14 – 92 defeated Central Goulburn Valley Football League 8.15 – 63.

The CGVFL officially went into "recess" at the 1953 CGVFL – AGM, but never reformed as a football competition.

A thorough history of this rural Australian rules football competition can be found in a great 1949 article in the Shepparton Advertiser by clicking on this citation.

CGVFL Senior Football Clubs
The following football clubs played in the CGVFL senior football competition between 1946 and 1952.
Ardmona: 1946 to 1949. Ardmona went into recess in 1950 
Dookie: 1946 to 1948. Joined the Benalla Tungamah Football League in 1949.
Dookie College: 1946 to 1952. Joined the Benalla Tungamah Football League in 1953.
Katandra: 1946 to 1952. Joined the Benalla Tungamah Football League in 1953. 
Miepoll: 1950 to 1952. Joined the Euroa & District Football League in 1953.
Mooroopna: 1946 to 1948. Mooroopna entered the Goulburn Valley Football League in 1949.
Shepparton: 1946 to 1949. Shepparton entered the Goulburn Valley Football League in 1950.
Shepparton Boys: 1950. Club folded prior to the 1951 season. 
Shepparton East: 1946 to 1952. Merged with SPC in 1949 to form City United FC, but Shepparton East kept a side in the CGVFL from 1950 to 1952. 
Shepparton Preserving Company (SPC): 1946 to 1949. Merged with Shepparton East to form City United FC in 1950, later to be known as Shepparton United Football Club.
Tallygaroopna Football Club: 1947 & 1948 (Moved down into the CGVFL Seconds competition in 1949), 1950 to 1952. Joined the Picola & District Football League in 1953.
Toolamba: 1947, 1950, 1951
Undera: 1950 to 1952. Merged with Mooroopna FC in 1953, then joined the Kyabram & District Football League in 1954. 
Wunghnu Football Club: 1950. Joined the Picola & District Football League in 1951 

Number of senior football teams in the CGVFL per season
1946: 8 
1947:10 
1948: 9 
1949: 6 
1950: 9 
1951: 7 
1952: 6

CGVFL Reserves Clubs
The following football clubs played in the CGVFL Seconds football competition between 1946 and 1949.
 All Blacks: 1946. Club folded in early 1947.
 Ardmona: 1946, 1947
 Dookie: 1946,  
 Dookie College: 1946, 1947,  
 Katandra: 1948, 1949
 Mooroopna: 1946, 1947, 1948
 Numurkah: 1948, 1949
 Shepparton: 1946, 1947, 1948, 1949
 Shepparton East: 1946, 1947, 1948, 1949
 Shepparton Boys: 1947, 1948, 1949
 Shepparton Preserving Company (SPC): 1947, 1948, 1949
 Tallygaroopna: 1946, 1949
 Toolamba: 1946, 1948, 1949
 Undera: 1948, 1949
 Wunghnu: 1947, 1948, 1949

Number of CGVFL Seconds team per season.
1946: 9 
1947: 8 
1948: 10 
1949: 10

CGVFL – Honourboard

 Shepparton RR – Shepparton Recreation Reserve (venue name was changed to Deakin Reserve in October, 1947, after Alfred Deakin)

CGVFL – Best and Fairest Award
This award was donated by and called the Shepparton Advertiser Trophy, in 1946 and 1947, then was called the Neal Hanlon Memorial Trophy from 1948 to 1952.

1946: Eric James also won the Goulburn Valley Football League's Morrison Medal in 1935 & 1937, with the Shepparton Football Club.

CGVFL – Leading Goalkicker

References

Defunct Australian rules football competitions in Victoria (Australia)
Goulburn